Kimbe Urban LLG is a local-level government (LLG) of West New Britain Province, Papua New Guinea. The LLG covers the town of Kimbe.

Wards
80. Kimbe Urban

References

Local-level governments of West New Britain Province